George Spencer Payne (25 March 1850 – 17 July 1892) was an English cricketer. He was born at East Grinstead, Sussex.

Payne made a single first-class appearance for Sussex against Kent in 1869 at the Higher Common Ground, Tunbridge Wells. Kent won the toss and elected to bat first, making 116 all out. In response, Sussex made 152 all out in their first-innings, with Payne being run out during it for a duck. Kent then made an improved 304 all out in their second-innings, during which Payne bowled four wicketless overs, to set Sussex 268 for victory.  However, Sussex failed in their chase and were dismissed for just 118, with Payne being dismissed for 4 runs by George Bennett. This was his only major appearance for Sussex.

He died at the town of his birth on 25 June 1892.

References

External links

1850 births
1892 deaths
People from East Grinstead
English cricketers
Sussex cricketers